Ludwig Brunow (9 July 1843, Lutheran - 13 January 1913, Berlin) was a German sculptor.

Life 
He was the illegitimate child of the local sexton's daughter and spent most of his youth working as a shepherd, but quickly caught up on his education when the opportunity arose. First, he went to Lübz, completing an apprenticeship in carpentry, then found work as a journeyman in Rostock, where he began taking drawing lessons. The following year, his talent was recognized by the art historian Friedrich Eggers and, at Eggers request, he moved to the Prussian Academy of Art. From 1871 to 1873, he worked as an assistant on the staffs of Rudolf Siemering and Christian Genschow.

He won his first award in 1876 at the Centennial Exhibition in Philadelphia, followed that same year by the "Verdienstkreuz" of the House Order of the Wendish Crown of  Mecklenburg-Schwerin. In 1893, he was appointed a "Grand Ducal Professor". In 1901 he closed his studio and stopped accepting large projects. In his spare time, he was a member of a private chamber music quartet, along with the poet Karl Eggers (Friedrich's brother) and Heinrich Seidel.

Selected major works 
An exhaustive list of his works may be found in the corresponding article on German Wikipedia
 1876: Statue of Helmut von Moltke, Moltkeplatz, Parchim
 1884: Statue of Frederick I, Berlin-Mitte, Ruhmeshalle (Hall of Fame); in Hohenzollern Castle since 1961.
 1884: Statue of Frederick William II, Berlin-Mitte, Ruhmeshalle; in Hohenzollern Castle since 1961.
 1886:: Cornice sculpture of Gustavus II Adolphus, Lützen, Rathaus.
 1891: Statues with copper sheet of John Albert I, Duke of Mecklenburg and Frederick Francis II, Rostock, Ständehaus; part of a four figure group (the other two are by )
 1893: Equestrian statue of Frederick Francis II. Schwerin, castle garden.
 1898: Statue of Otto von Bismarck, Elberfeld; melted down during World War II.
 1900: Equestrian statue of Kaiser Wilhelm I, Erfurt, Kaiserplatz; melted down during World War II.
 1902: Bust on a pedestal of Ernst Dircksen, Berlin, Bahnhof Friedrichstraße; melted down during World War II.

Gallery

References

Further reading 
 Fred Ruchhöft: Aus dem Leben des Bildhauers Ludwig Brunow. In: Stier und Greif, Vol.4, 1994, pgs.62–65

External links 

1843 births
1913 deaths
People from Lübz
People from the Grand Duchy of Mecklenburg-Schwerin
Prussian Academy of Arts alumni
20th-century German sculptors
20th-century German male artists
German male sculptors
19th-century sculptors